Gianmarco Raimondo (born November 28, 1990 in St. Catharines, Ontario) is a Canadian racing driver. In 2011 he competed in Formula 3 Euro Series.

Racing record

Complete Formula 3 Euro Series results
(key)

Complete GP2 Series results
(key) (Races in bold indicate pole position) (Races in italics indicate fastest lap)

References

External links
 
 
 

1990 births
Living people
Canadian people of Italian descent
Sportspeople from St. Catharines
Racing drivers from Ontario
Formula BMW USA drivers
Italian Formula Three Championship drivers
Formula 3 Euro Series drivers
Euroformula Open Championship drivers
GP2 Series drivers
Prema Powerteam drivers

RP Motorsport drivers
Trident Racing drivers
Motopark Academy drivers